Don Morgan  (born 1951) is a Canadian provincial politician. He is the Saskatchewan Party member of the Legislative Assembly of Saskatchewan for the constituency of Saskatoon Southeast. He, along with Minister Donna Harpauer, is the longest-serving current ministers in Canada. They both became Cabinet Ministers on November 21, 2007 and have been in cabinet ever since.

He currently serves as Minister of Crown Investments Corporation. He is also Minister responsible for Labour Relations and Workplace Safety, and Minister responsible for the Workers’ Compensation Board. He is  Minister responsible for major crowns like SaskEnegry, SGI, SaskPower, SaskTel, SaskGaming, and SaskWater. He also serves as chair of the caucus Legislation and Regulation Review Committee.

Morgan was born in Saskatoon, Saskatchewan. He is a graduate of the University of Saskatchewan College of Law. He was appointed Queen's Counsel in 1990. He practiced law from 1979 until 1988, when he became Chairman and CEO of the Saskatchewan Legal Aid Commission. Mr. Morgan again practiced law from 1992 to 2007.

Minister Morgan was first elected to the Saskatchewan Legislative Assembly in 2003 from Saskatoon Southeast constituency in 2003 and got re-elected again in 2007, 2011, 2016 and 2020 from the same seat. Mr. Morgan was first elected to the Saskatchewan Legislative Assembly in 2003. In Opposition, he served as Justice Critic, Deputy Critic for First Nations and Métis Relations, Opposition Deputy House Leader, and served on the Private Members' Bills Committee.

He was appointed Minister of Justice and Attorney General (JAG) in 2007. He also served as Minister responsible for SaskTel during his first term as Cabinet Minister. In June 2010, he was appointed Minister of Labour Relations and Workplace Safety (LRWS), a role he keeps today. In the May 2012 Cabinet shuffle, he gave up his JAG responsibilities and was appointed Minister of Advanced Education, in addition to his LRWS role. In the Cabinet shuffle of September 2013, Morgan relinquished his portfolio of Advanced Education, retained his position of Minister of Labour Relations and Workplace Safety, and added the position of Minister of Education. On August 23, 2016, Morgan was also appointed Deputy Premier, and in August 2017, he relinquished his Education portfolio and was re-appointed as Minister of Justice and Attorney General. Morgan was replaced as Deputy Premier by Gordon Wyant on February 2, 2018 following a cabinet shuffle due to Scott Moe's appointment as Premier.

He brought Clare's law in Saskatchewan and consolidated all the Labour and Workplace safety pieces into one piece of legislation which is now called Saskatchewan Employment Act. Over the years, he has appointed a growing number of Indigenous and first nations judges.

References

External links
http://www.gov.sk.ca/cabinet/morgan/ - Hon. Don Morgan, Minister of Advanced Education and Labour Relations and Workplace Safety
http://donmorgan.ca/ - Constituency Web Site

Living people
Saskatchewan Party MLAs
Attorneys-General of Saskatchewan
Deputy premiers of Saskatchewan
Lawyers in Saskatchewan
Members of the Executive Council of Saskatchewan
Politicians from Saskatoon
Canadian King's Counsel
21st-century Canadian politicians
1951 births